A rhumbline network, more properly called, a windrose network, or sometimes  also called harbour-finding chart, compass chart, or rhumb chart, is a navigational aid drawn on early portolan charts dating from the medieval to early modern period. This network is like a web (see picture) forming a grid on the map.

Before accurate surveying there was no method for measuring longitude at sea so maps possessed many distortions especially in the east west direction. There was also distortion due to the curvature of the Earth's surface. The multitude of compass roses with straight lines extending outwards across the map derived from how the maps were then made by compiling empirical observations from navigators who attempted to follow a constant bearing at sea.

To calculate a course to follow from a ship's position to a point of desired destination, one would identify the windrose thought to be closest to the ship's position. Then, using a parallel rule, the "line of course" taken from the rose to the point of destination would be transferred to the ship's known position.

The lines are not true rhumb lines in the modern sense, since these can only be drawn on modern map projections and not on 13th-century charts. They were close to true rhumb lines in the Mediterranean area but highly inaccurate in the Teixeira planisphere and the other planispheres drawn in any pre-Mercator projection.

The grid can be easily spotted (as parchment is quite translucent) by observing the map from its rear face, with a light source illuminating the other side. The hole in the center of the circle, origin of the whole network, is also clearly visible from the rear.

Rhumblines vs. windrose lines 

All portolan maps share these characteristic "windrose networks", which emanate from compass roses located at various points on the map (or mapamundi). These better called "windrose lines" are generated "by observation and the compass", and are designated today as "lines of course" or "lines of rhumb" ("rhumb lines" in the fourteenth century, traced on portolan's particular projection, though not to be confused with modern rhumb lines, meridians or isoazimuthals).

To understand that those lines should be better called "windrose lines", one has to know that portolan maps are characterized by the lack of map projection, for cartometric investigation has revealed that no projection was used in portolans, and those straight lines they could be loxodromes only if the chart was drawn on a suitable projection.

As Leo Bagrow states: "'The word ("Rhumbline") is wrongly applied to the sea-charts of this period, since a loxodrome gives an accurate course only when the chart is drawn on a suitable projection. Cartometric investigation has revealed that no projection was used in the early charts, for which we therefore retain the name 'portolan'.'"

Network design 

Pujades in his book "Les cartes portolanes" has a chapter with all known theories and, with the aim to clarify the controversial arguments, he shows an image of Petrus Vesconte drawing a portolan chart in which it is visible how he started by drawing first the rhumbline grid. Some authors call it "winds network" instead of using the term "rhumbline network" or "network of  rhumblines".

The circle is divided into sixteen equal parts defining a hexadecagon, then the network of sailing directions "for a 16 winds rose" is represented by groups of 16 "straight lines" called rhumblines. From each vertex, 7 rhumblines are projected towards the hexadecagon's interior connecting "in an alternated pace" to 7 of the vertex opposite to it, but without routing any line to connect that vertex to the other 8 intermixed vertex. The remaining 9 rhumblines (to complete the 16 winds) are projected from each vertex towards the exterior of the hexadecagon, although in some portolans those 9 lines do not appear.

The lines of the courses for the eight main directions (or winds) are drawn with black ink (or sometimes gold); the eight intermediate directions (half-winds) are drawn in green; and in the case of a 32 winds rose, the sixteen remaining (quarter-winds) are drawn in red. The intersection of this set of "rhumblines" determine on the portolans a varied pattern of symmetrical squares, parallelograms, trapezoids and triangles.

Vellum map creation process 

The process for a vellum chart creation used to be as follows:

 They prepared a vellum of good size, or several of them glued together.
 They drew a well-centered hexadecagon (or two linked by a vertex) with a network of 16 lines per vertex (with the different colors mentioned above: black, green and red).
 They copied on top of the grid the coasts lines trying to let the 16 vertex in visible places, as shown in Vescomte's portolan picture with its rhumbline network drawing a 16 vertex regular polygon (hexadecagon) that is perfectly centered on the parchment.
 In the case of the Mediterranean sometimes contained two hexadecagons and has the two opposite corners matching what is called the "portolan diaphragm " (axis of the Mediterranean .. or parallel of Rhodes).
 Finally they labeled and decorated the whole vellum with more or less profusion.

Planispheres with double hexadecagon 
In large planispheres, especially those containing the oceans (World Map), the cartographer used to draw two hexadecagons with the two opposite corners superimposed in the center of the vellum. There are plenty of mappae mundi that use the double-hexadecagon rhumbline networks but they can not be considered portolan charts since they do not have any ports indicated on them.

In the Cresques planisphere one is able to read the names of those lines which were winds: tramontana, levante, ponente, mezzogiorno, greco, sirocco, and lebegio. When limited to small seas, planispheres approximately follow both rhumb lines and great circles. But on big oceans they do not follow either of them, due to the imprecision of the map making of that time, corresponding more or less accurately to rhumb lines only in the Mediterranean portolan charts and deviating greatly in the Texeira planisfere (among others).

Double hexadecagon in Cantino's planisphere

Double hexadecagon in Texeira's planisphere

Use of rhumblines 

To calculate on a portolan chart the course to follow from a point of origin to a point of destination, one should transfer — using a parallel rule — the "line of course" drawn from the point of origin to the point of destination, on top of the Compass rose closest to the ship's position, obtaining on it the theoretical course to be followed when sailing towards the destination. This theoretical course may have to be modified (as many times as needed) when tacking if the wind is right ahead of you, or to correct the effects of leeway, currents, etc... that a sailor with experience should be able to calculate empirically.

See also 

 Catalan map
 Isoazimuthal
 La Cartografía Mallorquina
 Leonardo's world map
 Loxodromic navigation
 Majorcan cartographic school
 Marine sandglass
 Octant projection
 Orthodromic navigation

References

External links 
Portolan-Chart-Lines
 Medieval Navigation

Cartography
Navigation